Fällanden is a municipality in the district of Uster in the canton of Zürich in Switzerland, and belongs to the Glatt Valley (German: Glattal).

History
Fällanden is first mentioned around 820 as Fenichlanda.

Geography

Of this area, 40.8% is used for agricultural purposes, while 29.4% is forested. Of the rest of the land, 26.2% is settled (buildings or roads) and the remainder (3.6%) is non-productive (rivers, etc.).   housing and buildings made up 20% of the total area, while transportation infrastructure made up the rest (6.1%). Of the total unproductive area, water (streams and lakes) made up 1.2% of the area.   26.7% of the total municipal area was undergoing some type of construction.

The municipality is an agglomeration that grew up from the village of Fällanden and the settlements of Benglen, Pfaffhausen und Neuhausen.  It is located on the north-east slope of the Pfannenstiel mountain chain, with Greifensee lake nearby.

Transportation 
Bus lines branch toward Schwerzenbach, Duebendorf, Maur and uphill directly to Zurich, giving good enough connection for the people to work in central areas of Zurich. Fällanden has special bus lanes, ensuring efficient operation also in high traffic hours.

Demographics
, 18.2% of the population was made up of foreign nationals.   the gender distribution of the population was 49.3% male and 50.7% female. Over the last 10 years the population has grown at a rate of 12.6%. Most of the population speaks German  (86.8%), with French being second most common ( 1.9%) and English being third ( 1.8%).

In the 2007 election the most popular party was the SVP which received 30.8% of the vote.  The next three most popular parties were the SPS (18.3%), the FDP (17%) and the CSP (13.4%).

The age distribution of the population is children and teenagers (0–19 years old) make up 21.3% of the population, while adults (20–64 years old) make up 67.6% and seniors (over 64 years old) make up 11.1%.  The entire Swiss population is generally well educated.  In Fällanden about 84.3% of the population (between age 25-64) have completed either non-mandatory upper secondary education or additional higher education (either university or a Fachhochschule).  There are 2855 households in Fällanden.

Fällanden has an unemployment rate of 2.62%.  , there were 21 people employed in the primary economic sector and about 10 businesses involved in this sector.  988 people are employed in the secondary sector and there are 68 businesses in this sector.  1221 people are employed in the tertiary sector, with 213 businesses in this sector.   31.8% of the working population were employed full-time, and 68.2% were employed part-time.

 there were 2178 Catholics and 2887 Protestants in Fällanden. In the 2000 census, religion was broken down into several smaller categories. Of the rest of the population, 0% were Muslim, 5.6% belonged to another religion (not listed), 3.1% did not give a religion, and 17.9% were atheist or agnostic.

The historical population is given in the following table:

Industry
The town has a small industrial district, largely dominated by Bruker that manufactures medical NMR scanners and related devices. It is the former Swiss Trüb-Täuber, purchased by Bruker in 1964. Another notable manufacturer is Bucher Leichtbau AG (aircraft interior and medical equipment like seats, tables and lockers)  There are also more facilities like glass factory and some others.  The , 380 kV Sils-Fällanden power line ends near the town towards Dübendorf.

Notable people
Rudolf Wolf (1816-1893), astronomer and mathematician
Albert Meyer (1870-1953), politician and member of the Swiss Federal Council

References

External links 

  
 

Municipalities of the canton of Zürich